Liberty Alliance, LLC is a private United States company with its headquarters in Atlanta, Georgia. It operates a collection of conservative and Christian websites.

In August 2012, Inc. magazine ranked Liberty Alliance number 576 on its sixth annual Inc. 5000, which is a ranking of the nation's fastest-growing private companies. It was also ranked number 12 in the fastest-growing top media companies category and ranked the 20th fastest-growing private company in the Atlanta, Georgia area.

The Liberty Alliance publishes books through an imprint called White Hall.

Company leadership 
 Brandon Vallorani, founder
 Jared Vallorani, chief executive officer
 Tracey Lee, chief financial officer
 Kenny Rudd, business manager
 Joe Weathers, VP, marketing
 Ted Slater, VP, website development

References

External links 
Liberty Alliance

Christian mass media companies
Christian websites
Mass media companies of the United States
American political blogs
Conservative organizations in the United States
American religious websites